Studena Point (‘Nos Studena’ \'nos stu-'de-na\) is a rocky point forming the west side of the entrance to Dalchev Cove on the north coast of Parker Peninsula in the northeast part of Anvers Island, the Palmer Archipelago in Antarctica.  It projects 1.4 km northwards into Fournier Bay and separates the termini of Kleptuza Glacier to the west and Altimir Glacier to the east.

The point is named after the settlements of Studena in Western and Southern Bulgaria, and Upper and Lower Studena in northern Bulgaria.

Location
British mapping in 1980.

Maps
 British Antarctic Territory.  Scale 1:200000 topographic map.  DOS 610 Series, Sheet W 64 62.  Directorate of Overseas Surveys, UK, 1980.
 Antarctic Digital Database (ADD). Scale 1:250000 topographic map of Antarctica. Scientific Committee on Antarctic Research (SCAR), 1993–2016.

References
 Studena Point. SCAR Composite Gazetteer of Antarctica.
 Bulgarian Antarctic Gazetteer. Antarctic Place-names Commission. (details in Bulgarian, basic data in English)

External links
 Studena Point. Copernix satellite image

Headlands of the Palmer Archipelago
Bulgaria and the Antarctic